New York has two Major League Baseball teams, the New York Yankees (based in the Bronx) and the New York Mets (based in Queens). New York is home to three National Hockey League franchises: the New York Rangers in Manhattan, the New York Islanders on Long Island and the Buffalo Sabres in Buffalo. New York has two National Basketball Association teams, the New York Knicks in Manhattan, and the Brooklyn Nets in Brooklyn. New York has one Major League Soccer team: New York City FC. Although the New York Red Bulls represent the New York metropolitan area they play in Red Bull Arena, located in Harrison, New Jersey.

New York is the home of one National Football League team, the Buffalo Bills (based in the suburb of Orchard Park). Although the New York Giants and New York Jets represent the New York metropolitan area and were previously located in New York City, they play in MetLife Stadium, located in East Rutherford, New Jersey, and both have their headquarters and training facilities in New Jersey. The Meadowlands stadium hosted Super Bowl XLVIII in 2014, in which New York and New Jersey shared hosting duties.

There are a variety of minor league teams and leagues throughout the State of New York. The American Hockey League has three of its 31 teams in upstate New York. Baseball leagues that include New York in their territory include the class AAA International League (three teams), class AA Double-A Northeast (the Binghamton Rumble Ponies), independent professional Atlantic League (the Long Island Ducks), and amateur baseball leagues such as the New York Collegiate Baseball League, the Perfect Game Collegiate Baseball League and the Southwestern New York Men's Baseball League.

Numerous college sports teams play in New York State at all levels; the Division III State University of New York Athletic Conference and Empire 8 consist almost entirely of New York-based teams.

The state of New York hosted the Olympic Winter Games in 1932 and 1980 in Lake Placid.

Professional teams

Current teams

Teams that have relocated

Defunct

Major league professional championships

New York Yankees (MLB)
27 World Series titles
 1923
 1927
 1928
 1932
 1936
 1937
 1938
 1939
 1941
 1943
 1947
 1949
 1950
 1951
 1952
 1953
 1956
 1958
 1961
 1962
 1977
 1978
 1996
 1998
 1999
 2000
 2009

New York Mets (MLB) 
2 World Series titles
 1969
 1986

New York Giants (MLB) 
5 World Series titles
 1905
 1921
 1922
 1933
 1954

Brooklyn Dodgers (MLB) 
1 World Series title
 1955

New York Knicks (NBA) 
2 NBA Finals titles
 1970
 1973

New York / Brooklyn Nets (NBA) 
2 ABA Finals titles
 1974
 1976

Rochester Royals (NBA) 
1 NBA Finals title
 1951

Syracuse Nationals (NBA) 
1 NBA Finals title
 1955

New York Giants (NFL) 
4 NFL championships (pre-Super Bowl)
 1927
 1934
 1938
 1956

4 Super Bowl titles
 1986 (XXI)
 1990 (XXV)
 2007 (XLII)
 2011 (XLVI)

New York Jets (NFL) 
1 Super Bowl title
 1968 (III)

Buffalo Bills (NFL) 
2 AFL championships (pre-Super Bowl)
 1964
 1965

New York Rangers (NHL) 
4 Stanley Cup titles
 1928
 1933
 1940
 1994

New York Islanders (NHL) 
4 Stanley Cup titles
 1980
 1981
 1982
 1983

New York City FC (MLS) 
1 MLS Cup title
 2021

New York Cosmos (NASL) 
5 Soccer Bowl titles
 1972
 1977
 1978
 1980
 1982

Rochester Lancers (NASL) 
1 Soccer Bowl title
 1970

College sports

NCAA

The following is a list of current National Collegiate Athletic Association (NCAA) affiliates in New York state:

NAIA

The following is a list of National Association of Intercollegiate Athletics (NAIA) affiliates in New York state:

USCAA

The following is a list of United States Collegiate Athletic Association (USCAA) affiliates in New York state:

Olympics
New York hosted the 1932 and 1980 Winter Olympics at Lake Placid. The 1980 Games are known for the USA–USSR hockey game dubbed the "Miracle on Ice" in which a group of American college students and amateurs defeated the heavily favored Soviet national ice hockey team 4–3 and went on to win the gold medal against Finland. Along with St. Moritz, Switzerland and Innsbruck, Austria, Lake Placid is one of the three cities to have hosted the Winter Olympic Games twice.

New York City bid to host the 2012 Summer Olympics but lost to London.

See also 

Athletics in upstate New York
Scouting in New York
Sports in New York City
Sports in New York's Capital District
Sports in Syracuse, New York

References

External links